The "Taliaferro", "Robinson" or "Robertson" was a small-sized apple grown at Monticello by Thomas Jefferson. This cultivar appears to be extinct, though some horticulturalists assert that the 'Highland County' cultivar may be related, or even the same cultivar under a different name.

Jefferson called the variety "Taliaferro" in reference to a Major Taliaferro, from whom he got his first samples of the fruit. Taliaferro himself claimed that the apples came from a farm owned by the Robertson or Robinson family, hence the other varietal names.  

Jefferson stated the "Taliaferro" apple was very juicy and good for eating. He praised it as the best cider apple he had tasted, producing a hard cider similar to wine or Champagne. In 1835, a gentleman named William Kenrick described the fruits as being small, only 1-2 inches in diameter, with white, red-streaked skin. Kenrick claimed the apples were unfit for eating, but reaffirmed their value in cidermaking.

References

Sources 

Apple cultivars
Extinct cultivars
Monticello